The Co-cathedral of San Pedro (Spanish: Concatedral de San Pedro) is a medieval building in Soria, Spain. It is in the Roman Catholic Diocese of Osma-Soria.

History 
Dedicated to St. Peter, it was a collegiate church from the 12th century. It was built in the centre of the medieval town.
It was raised to the status of cathedral in the 1950s.

Conservation 
The cloister was given a heritage listing in the 1920s.

It was declared Bien de Interés Cultural in 1979.

References 

Bien de Interés Cultural landmarks in the Province of Soria
Soria
Soria
Roman Catholic churches in Soria
Romanesque architecture in Castile and León